Lygodactylus blancae is a species of gecko, a lizard in the family Gekkonidae. The species is endemic to Madagascar.

Etymology
The specific name, blancae, is in honor of French geneticist Françoise Blanc.

Habitat
The natural habitat of L. blancae is unknown.

Reproduction
L. blancae is oviparous.

References

Further reading
Glaw F, Vences M (2006). A Field Guide to Amphibians and Reptiles of Madagascar, Third Edition. Cologne, Germany: Vences & Glaw Verlag. 496 pp. .
Mezzasalma M, Andreone F, Aprea G, Glaw F, Odierna G, Guarino FM (2016). "Molecular phylogeny, biogeography and chromosome evolution of Malagasy dwarf geckos of the genus Lygodactylus (Squamata, Gekkonidae)". Zoologica Scripta 46: 42–54.
Pasteur G (1995). "Biodiversité et reptiles: diagnoses de sept nouvelles espèces fossiles et actuelles du genre de lézards Lygodactylus (Sauria, Gekkonidae)". Dumerilia 2: 1–21. (Lygodactylus blancae, new species). (in French).
Rösler H (2000). "Kommentierte Liste de rezent, subrezent und fossil bekannten Gekkotaxa (Reptilia: Gekkonomorpha)". Gekkota 2: 28–153. (Lygodactylus blancae, p. 92). (in German).

Lygodactylus
Reptiles of Madagascar
Endemic fauna of Madagascar
Reptiles described in 1995